The following is a list of courts and tribunals in the Northern Territory of Australia:

Community Court (Northern Territory)
Court of Appeal of the Northern Territory of Australia
Coroners Court of the Northern Territory
Court of Summary Jurisdiction
Family Matters Court
Lands, Planning and Mining Tribunal
Local Court of the Northern Territory
Magistrates Court of the Northern Territory
Mental Health Review Tribunal
Northern Territory Civil and Administrative Tribunal (NTCAT)
Supreme Court of the Northern Territory
Work Health Court
Youth Justice Court

Northern Territory
 
Courts